Atsuko is a feminine Japanese given name.

Possible writings
Atsuko can be written using different combinations of kanji characters. Here are some examples: 

惇子, "kind, child"
淳子, "pure, child"
敦子, "kindliness, child"
篤子, "fervent, child"
厚子, "thick, child"
渥子, "kindness, child"
湊子, "harbor, child"
集子, "collect, child"
鳩子, "pigeon, child"
熱子, "heat, child"
温子, "warm, child"
充子, "sufficient, child"

Atsuko is generally used as a girl's name. The final syllable "ko" is generally written with the kanji character for child (子). It is a common suffix to female names in Japan and usually indicates that it is a girl's name as masculine Japanese names rarely use the kanji for "child".

The name can also be written in hiragana あつこ or katakana アツコ.

Notable people with the name
Atsuko Anzai (安西 篤子, born 1927), Japanese writer
Atsuko Asano (浅野 温子, born 1961), Japanese actress
Atsuko Asano (writer) (浅野 敦子, born 1954), Japanese writer
Atsuko Enomoto (榎本 温子, born 1979), Japanese singer and voice actress
Atsuko Hashimoto (橋本 有津子), Japanese jazz musician
Atsuko Hirayanagi (平栁 敦子, born 1975), Japanese-American filmmaker
Atsuko Ikeda (池田 厚子, born 1931), fourth daughter of Emperor Shōwa and Empress Kōjun
Atsuko Inaba (稲葉 貴子, born 1974), Japanese idol and singer
Atsuko Ishizuka (いしづか あつこ, born 1981), Japanese animator and director
Atsuko Kawada (川田あつ子, born 1965), Japanese actress, singer and writer
, Japanese actress
Atsuko Maeda (前田 敦子, born 1990), Japanese singer, actress and idol
Atsuko Mine (峰 あつ子, born 1951), Japanese voice actress
Atsuko Miyaji (宮地 充子, born 1965), Japanese cryptographer and number theorist
Atsuko Nakajima (中嶋 敦子, born 1961), Japanese animator, character designer, and illustrator
Atsuko Okatsuka, Japanese-American comedian
Atsuko Seki (関 敦子, born 1964), Japanese pianist
Atsuko Seta (瀬田 敦子, born 1955), Japanese classical pianist
Atsuko Shimoda (下田 敦子, born 1940), Japanese politician
, Japanese sport shooter
Atsuko Takahata (高畑 淳子, born 1954), Japanese actress and voice actress
, Japanese speed skater
Atsuko Tanaka (voice actress) (田中 敦子, born 1962), Japanese voice actress
Atsuko Tanaka (artist) (田中 敦子, 1932-2005), Japanese artist
Atsuko Tokuda (徳田 敦子, born 1955), Japanese former badminton player
Atsuko Wakai (若井 敦子, born 1971), Japanese karate competitor
Atsuko Yamano (山野 敦子, born 1964), Japanese musician
Atsuko Yamashita (山下 敦子, born 1975), Japanese singer, vocalist of pop band angela 
Atsuko Yuya (湯屋 敦子, born 1968), Japanese voice actress

Fictional characters
Atsuko Natsume (夏目 温子), known as Nuku Nuku, of the All Purpose Cultural Cat Girl Nuku Nuku anime (OVA & TV) series
Atsuko Urameshi (浦飯 温子), a character in the manga series Yu Yu Hakusho
Atsuko "Akko" Kagami (加賀美 あつ子), titular heroine of Himitsu no Akko-chan
Atsuko "Akko" Kagari (篝 敦子), a lead character from Little Witch Academia
Atsuko Jackson (アツコ・ジャキソン), a character in the anime series Michiko & Hatchin
Atsuko Mutsuzuka (六塚 温子), a character in the light novel series The Irregular at Magic High School

See also
8414 Atsuko, a main-belt asteroid

Japanese feminine given names